Judge Ruiz may refer to:

David A. Ruiz (born 1973), judge of the United States District Court for the Northern District of Ohio
Rodolfo Ruiz (born 1979), judge of the United States District Court for the Southern District of Florida